Tseku (Tzuku) is a Tibetic language of Tibet. Tournadre (2013) classifies it with Khams Tibetan.

References

Languages of China
Central Bodish languages